John Bernard Philip Humbert de Salis, 9th Count de Salis-Soglio, TD, John da Buri, Graf v. Salis-Soglio, (London, 16 November 1947-Cà Buri, Mezzane di Sotto, Veneto, Italy 14 March 2014); SRI Comes, Illustris et Magnificus, was a Count de Salis-Soglio. He was a ICRC delegate and envoy; Knight Grand Cross of Honour and Devotion (2000) of the Sovereign Military Order of Malta (knight, 1974), and Knight Grand Cross of the Order of Merit of the Order of Malta with Swords, first ambassador of the Order to Thailand 1986–98, Cambodia 1993–98, president of its Swiss Association (1995-2000) and of CIOMAL (Comité International de l'Ordre de Malte), 2000–08; British soldier and lawyer; Valpolicella vigneron and hereditary Knight of the Golden Spur.

Life 

An Imperial Count of the Holy Roman Empire (Reichsgraf), (created by letters patent dated Vienna, 12 March 1748 for Envoy Peter de Salis-Soglio (1675-1749), of Chur and Chiavenna, and his son Jerome (Naturalized British in 1731), by Emperor Francis I), John de Salis was the only child of Lt. Colonel John Eugène, 8th Count de Salis (1891-1949), Irish Guards, by his Roman wife Maria Camilla (1926-1953), daughter of General Umberto Presti di Camarda by Teresa (d.1993), daughter of Filippo Nereo Vignola, of Mezzane and Verona.

The grandson of the British diplomat, Irish landowner and Catholic re-convert Sir John Francis Charles, 7th Count de Salis-Soglio, his earliest years were spent at 10 Priory Walk, Kensington, and 26 Roedean Crescent, Roehampton Gate, SW15. His father died when he was under two and his mother when he was five, his step-father when he was 10 and one of his two paternal uncles when he was four. His paternal grandparents had also died, in 1902 and 1939, so he was subsequently brought-up, inter-alia, by Franco-Belgian cousins in France (the widow and family of the 3rd Duc de Magenta at Sully, in particular), his remaining paternal uncle in Wiltshire, and his Veronese maternal grandmother, Teresa Vignola Presti.

He was educated at Downside School, read law at Corpus Christi College, Cambridge (LLB (1972) and LLM), and was called to the Bar, Gray's Inn (1970). Later he was a tenant and then door-tenant, at 1 Brick Court, Middle Temple, EC4, and from 1972 lived at 12 First Street, SW3 and then from 1975 in two houses knocked together at 28 Upper Cheyne Row, Chelsea, SW3. Whilst in London he was also a member of the board of management of the Hospital of St John and St Elizabeth.

Alongside learning and practicing the law he served in the Cambridge University Officer Training Corps (CUOTC), the HAC (within the Territorial and Army Volunteer Reserve), then in 1972, after meeting its then Colonel, Viscount Monckton, one of whose sisters-in-law happened to be married to one of John's first cousins, transferred to the 9th/12th Royal Lancers (Prince of Wales's). He was with them in Northern Ireland and retired a (Brevet) Major in 1988, having circa 1984 been awarded the Territorial Decoration.

The combination of law of war, humanitarian instincts, soldiering and some family precedent (his father had been the Knight of Justice of the Order of St. John of Jerusalem delegate for the revision of the Geneva Convention in July 1929) lead De Salis to become the delegate of International Committee of the Red Cross Missions in the Middle East (Beirut, 1982) and Africa (Rhodesia), and head of delegation in Iraq (1980–81) and Thailand (1981-84, Cambodian refugees), and their special envoy in Lebanon (1982). In July 1983 de Salis wrote: "It is a heartbreaking fact that ICRC being essentially concerned with the victims of armed conflicts, is more directly concerned operationally with the relief of suffering rather than its abolition."

On leaving England and moving to Switzerland he became a special officer in the Swiss Army's Panzergrenadiers, and set about a new career as a financier: as partner of Gautier Salis et Cie Geneva (1989–96), vice-chairman of Bank Lips Zurich (1996–98), managing director of European Capital Partners (Switzerland) SA (1999-), and as director of Amadeus SA Geneva (2000-).

In the meantime he had taken over his grandmother's 160 acre farm in the Valle di Buri, Mezzane di Sotto, and developed it from dairy to vineyard. By 2010 Conti de Salis-Soglio Wines Verona had taken shape, partly inspired by his courageous and visionary Valtelline cousin Conte Cesare Sertoli Salis of Tirano and Milan (1952-2005) and his Canua Sforzato, akin to Valpolicella's Amarone. John's eighteenth century ancestors, 3rd Count Peter in particular, had also been growers of hemp and vines in eighteenth century Valtelline.

In addition to the above Count de Salis was a member of the British Association of the Sovereign Military Order of Malta; had the gold medal with Swords (Beirut) 1982; was a Knight of Justice of the Sacred Military Constantinian Order of Saint George; a Knight Grand Cross of the Order of the White Elephant (Thailand); and an hereditary Knight of the Golden Spur (Eques Auratus) (1571).

He was next male representative of Charles, second and last Viscount Fane and Baron of Loughuyre (aka Lough Gur), and of Vice-Admiral Francis William Drake, of Hillingdon, sometime governor of Newfoundland (1752-4), younger brother of the last Drake baronet of Buckland Abbey, and thus heir-general of Admiral Sir Francis Drake himself. His only listed recreation was melancholia.

Clubs
He was a member of the Cavalry and Guards Club, the Beefsteak Club, Cercle de la Terasse (Geneva), the Royal Bangkok Sports Club, and the Chelsea Arts Club.

Family

He was firstly married to Samaritana Contessina di Serego della Scala (born 1950 in Verona, Italy), daughter of Dr. Cortesia Conte di Serego, on 20 January 1973. Months later their marriage was annulled and then dissolved in 1985. They had no children.

He then married (Vers l’Eglise, Vaud 1986) Marie-Claude (born in 1956 in Geneva, Switzerland), third daughter of Swiss Army Colonel René-Henri Wüst and Marie-Thérèse Bussard. The couple had three children:
John-Maximilian Henry Fane de Salis, 10th Count de Salis-Soglio (b. 1986) 
Lara Anastasia Fane de Salis (b. 1995)
Camille Charlotte Fane de Salis (b. 1995)

References

Sources
 
 Burke's Peerage, Foreign Noblemen / Foreign Titles sections: 1851, 1936, 1956, etc.;
 Debrett's Peerage, Foreign Titles section, 1920, 1925, etc.;
 Der Grafliche Hauser, Band XI [volume 11], Genealogisches Handbuch Des Adels, C. A. Starke Verlag, Limburg an der Lahn, 1983 (pps 331–356);
 Burke's Irish Family Records, ed. Hugh Montgomery-Massingberd, Burke's Peerage Ltd, London, 1976;

1947 births
2014 deaths
20th-century Irish landowners
21st-century Irish landowners
Alumni of Corpus Christi College, Cambridge
English viticulturists
People educated at Downside School
Knights of Malta
British diplomats
Swiss diplomats
British people of Swiss descent
John Bernard Philip Humbert
Swiss nobility
Swiss people of British descent
Swiss people of Italian descent
Italian people of Swiss descent
Swiss-Italian people
British people of Italian descent
Businesspeople from Verona
Red Cross personnel
Swiss humanitarians
Swiss Roman Catholics
British Roman Catholics
English Roman Catholics
People from Chelsea, London
Members of Gray's Inn
9th/12th Royal Lancers officers
People of Anglo-Irish descent
British people of Belgian descent
People from Richmond, London
People from the canton of Vaud
John de Salis, 9th Count de Salis-Soglio
Counts de Salis-Soglio and Comtes de Salis-Seewis
John Bernard